Raphaël Patron Akakpo (born 1 December 1973) is a Togolese retired professional footballer. He has spent time in Ghana, Egypt, Thailand, Brunei, Malaysia, India, and Vietnam throughout his career and is assistant to Steven Polack of Asante Kotoko in Ghana.

Playing career

Brunei and Malaysia

Akakpo arrived in Brunei at the start of the 1997 Liga Perdana Malaysia to play for the Bruneian national football team playing in the Malaysian league. By then, he had 15 international caps for Togo and was on the books of Tero Sasana of Thailand, scoring 15 goals in the previous term.

Discharged by Brunei in 2002, Akakpo was signed by Terengganu FA in early 2003; however, since his transfer breached M-League rules, Terengganu were not allowed to sign him despite pleading to the Football Association of Malaysia.

India

Lifting the 2003 Indian Federation Cup with Mahindra United, the Togolese attacker mustered a brace in a 3–1 league win over Sporting Clube de Goa on 25 April 2004.

Honours

Team 
Mahindra United
POMIS Cup: 2003
Indian Federation Cup: 2003, 2005
Indian Super Cup: 2003

Individual
 
  Meritorius Service Medal (PJK) (1999)

Coaching career

WAFA SC

Promoted to head coach of WAFA in 2016, Akakpo expressed desire to ameliorate the pitch conditions of the Ghanaian Premier League, leading WAFA to their first ever away victory in 27 attempts, beating Wa All Stars 4–1.

In March 2022, Akakpo was appointed head coach of Cheetah F.C. of Kasoa, Ghana.

References

External links 
 Akakpo hampakan Bujang
 Break will affect the excitement in the league- Akakpo Patron
 Sam Addy coy on Akakpo Patron's status
 at National-Football-Teams

Living people
Association football forwards
Togolese footballers
1973 births
V.League 1 players
Mahindra United FC players
Togo international footballers
Expatriate footballers in Malaysia
Expatriate football managers in Ghana
Togolese expatriate sportspeople in Ghana
Togolese expatriate sportspeople in Malaysia
Togolese expatriate footballers
Expatriate footballers in Vietnam
Expatriate footballers in India
Expatriate footballers in Brunei
Terengganu FC players
Expatriate footballers in Ghana
Asante Kotoko S.C. players
Togolese football managers
21st-century Togolese people